Cornered is a single-panel comic strip by Mike Baldwin. It was launched on April 1, 1996, and is distributed through Andrews McMeel Syndication. On dailies, Cornered usually has characters' dialogue below the panel, whereas on Sundays the characters' dialogue is often in speaking bubbles. Everybody, including animals, wears glasses.

External links 
 

Canadian comic strips